The 2000 Norwegian Football Cup was the 95th edition of the Norwegian Football Cup. The Cup was won by Odd Grenland after they defeated Viking in the final with the score 2–1.

Because of competing of the national team at the UEFA Euro 2000, the 14 teams from Tippeligaen was bye to the third round.

Calendar
Below are the dates for each round as given by the official schedule:

First round 

|colspan="3" style="background-color:#97DEFF"|23 May 2000

|-
|colspan="3" style="background-color:#97DEFF"|24 May 2000

|-
|colspan="3" style="background-color:#97DEFF"|25 May 2000

|}

Second round 

|colspan="3" style="background-color:#97DEFF"|7 June 2000

|-
|colspan="3" style="background-color:#97DEFF"|8 June 2000

|}

Third round 

|colspan="3" style="background-color:#97DEFF"|27 June 2000

|-
|colspan="3" style="background-color:#97DEFF"|28 June 2000

|}

Fourth round

|colspan="3" style="background-color:#97DEFF"|19 July 2000

|-
|colspan="3" style="background-color:#97DEFF"|20 July 2000

|-
|colspan="3" style="background-color:#97DEFF"|26 July 2000

|}

Quarter-finals

Semi-finals

Final

References

External links 
 http://www.rsssf.no

Norwegian Football Cup seasons
Norwegian Football Cup
Football Cup